Irving Starr (1905–1982) was an American film producer. He worked for a number of studios including MGM, Universal Pictures and Columbia Pictures, generally employed on lower-budget films. Later in his career he also worked in television.

Selected filmography

 Tombstone Canyon (1932)
 Fargo Express (1933)
 The Lone Avenger (1933)
 King of the Arena (1933)
 Phantom Thunderbolt (1933)
 The Fiddlin' Buckaroo (1933)
 When a Man Sees Red (1934)
 Rocky Rhodes (1934)
 His Night Out (1935)
 Border Brigands (1934)
 Stone of Silver Creek (1935)
 Empty Saddles (1936)
 Silver Spurs (1936)
 Ride 'Em Cowboy (1936)
 Nobody's Fool (1936)
 For the Service (1936)
 Damaged Goods (1937)
 The Westland Case (1937)
 Boss of Lonely Valley (1937)
 Left-Handed Law (1937)
 The Black Doll (1938)
 Danger on the Air (1938)
 The Last Warning (1938)
 The Lady in the Morgue (1938)
 The Last Express (1938)
 Gambling Ship (1938)
 Mystery of the White Room (1939)
 The Witness Vanishes (1939)
 Inside Information (1939)
 Music in My Heart (1940)
 Time Out for Rhythm (1941)
 Our Wife (1941)
 Fingers at the Window (1942)
 Sunday Punch (1942)
 The Affairs of Martha (1942)
 Bataan (1943)
 Harrigan's Kid (1943)
 Swing Fever (1943)
 Something for the Boys (1944)
 Four Jills in a Jeep (1944)
 The Cockeyed Miracle (1946)
 The Gallant Blade (1948)
 Johnny Allegro (1949)
 Slightly French (1949)
 The Half-Breed (1952)
 Battles of Chief Pontiac (1952)
 A Story of David (1960)
 Return of the Gunfighter (1966)

References

Bibliography
 Hischak, Thomas S. American Plays and Musicals on Screen: 650 Stage Productions and Their Film and Television Adaptations. McFarland & Company, 2005.

External links

1905 births
1982 deaths
American film producers
People from New York City